The UEFA European Under-18 Championship 2001 Final Tournament was held in Finland. Players born after 1 January 1982 were eligible to participate in this competition. This championship was the final one to use the Under-18 format; starting in 2002, the event was reformed as a UEFA European Under-19 Championship for players under 19 years of age.

Teams

The following teams had qualified for the tournament:

 
 
 
  (host)

Venues
The final tournament was held in four stadiums located in four Finnish cities.

Results

Group stage

Group A

Group B

Third place play-off

Final

Goalscorers
8 goals
 Jorge Perona

4 goals
 Danko Lazović

3 goals

 Daniel Sjölund
 Łukasz Nawotczyński
 Jovan Damjanović

2 goals

 Serge Djamba-Shango
 Jiri Koubsky
 Filip Trojan
 Łukasz Madej
 Dariusz Zawadzki
 Jacinto Elá
 Emir Bihorac
 Zvjezdan Misimović

1 goal

 Tim Aelbrecht
 Jonathan Walasiak
 David Bystroň
 Petr Čoupek
 Tomas Dujka
 Martin Hudec
 Tomáš Řehák
 Mads Beierholm
 Peter Benjaminsen
 Antti Okkonen
 Jussi Peteri
 Henri Scheweleff
 Mikel Arteta
 Rafał Grzelak
 Przemysław Kaźmierczak
 Wojciech Łobodziński
 Mateusz Żytko
 Jaroslaw Karabkin
 Pavlo Kutas
 Serhiy Motuz
 Dmitri Pintšuk
 Saša Cilinšek

See also
 2001 UEFA European Under-18 Championship qualifying

External links
Results by RSSSF
Official Site

 
2000–01 in European football
2001
2001
2001 in Finnish football
2000–01 in Belgian football
2000–01 in Polish football
2000–01 in Czech football
2000–01 in Yugoslav football
2000–01 in Spanish football
2000–01 in Danish football
2000–01 in Ukrainian football
July 2001 sports events in Europe
2001 in youth association football